The 1969 UCLA Bruins baseball team represented the University of California, Los Angeles in the 1969 NCAA University Division baseball season. The Bruins played their home games at Sawtelle Field. The team was coached by Art Reichle in his 24th year at UCLA.

The Bruins won the District VIII Regional to advance to the College World Series, where they were defeated by the Arizona State Sun Devils.

Roster

Schedule 

! style="" | Regular Season
|- valign="top" 

|- align="center" bgcolor="#ccffcc"
| 1 || February 7 ||  || Sawtelle Field • Los Angeles, California || 6–0 || 1–0 || 0–0
|- align="center" bgcolor="#ccffcc"
| 2 || February 11 ||  || Sawtelle Field • Los Angeles, California || 10–0 || 2–0 || 0–0
|- align="center" bgcolor="#ffcccc"
| 3 || February 13 ||  || Sawtelle Field • Los Angeles, California || 0–1 || 2–1 || 0–0
|- align="center" bgcolor="#ccffcc"
| 4 || February 14 || at  || Varsity Park • Fresno, California || 4–0 || 3–1 || 0–0
|- align="center" bgcolor="#ccffcc"
| 5 || February 26 ||  || Sawtelle Field • Los Angeles, California || 5–4 || 4–1 || 0–0
|-

|- align="center" bgcolor="#ccffcc"
| 6 || March 1 ||  || Sawtelle Field • Los Angeles, California || 11–1 || 5–1 || 0–0
|- align="center" bgcolor="#ccffcc"
| 7 || March 1 || Cal Poly || Sawtelle Field • Los Angeles, California || 5–2 || 6–1 || 0–0
|- align="center" bgcolor="#ccffcc"
| 8 || March 4 ||  || Sawtelle Field • Los Angeles, California || 14–7 || 7–1 || 0–0
|- align="center" bgcolor="#ccffcc"
| 9 || March 5 || at  || Anderson Field • Los Angeles, California || 3–1 || 8–1 || 0–0
|- align="center" bgcolor="#ccffcc"
| 10 || March 7 || at  || Matador Field • Northridge, California || 8–3 || 9–1 || 0–0
|- align="center" bgcolor="#ccffcc"
| 11 || March 8 || at  || Unknown • San Diego, California || 10–6 || 10–1 || 0–0
|- align="center" bgcolor="#ccffcc"
| 12 || March 8 || at San Diego State || Unknown • San Diego, California || 9–0 || 11–1 || 0–0
|- align="center" bgcolor="#ccffcc"
| 13 || March 11 ||  || Sawtelle Field • Los Angeles, California || 6–5 || 12–1 || 0–0
|- align="center" bgcolor="#ccffcc"
| 14 || March 12 || at Claremont || Unknown • Claremont, California || 13–3 || 13–1 || 0–0
|- align="center" bgcolor="#ccffcc"
| 15 || March 14 || at  || Blair Field • Long Beach, California || 2–1 || 14–1 || 0–0
|- align="center" bgcolor="#ccffcc"
| 16 || March 25 ||  || Sawtelle Field • Los Angeles, California || 5–4 || 15–1 || 0–0
|- align="center" bgcolor="#ccffcc"
| 17 || March 25 || Utah || Sawtelle Field • Los Angeles, California || 3–0 || 16–1 || 0–0
|- align="center" bgcolor="#bbbbbb"
| 18 || March 28 || at  || Unknown • Orange, California || 2–2 || 16–1–1 || 0–0
|- align="center" bgcolor="#ccffcc"
| 19 || March 29 || at  || Reeder Field • Los Angeles, California || 8–1 || 17–1–1 || 0–0
|- align="center" bgcolor="#ffcccc"
| 20 || March 29 || at Cal State Los Angeles || Reeder Field • Los Angeles, California || 4–5 || 17–2–1 || 0–0
|- align="center" bgcolor="#ffcccc"
| 21 || March 31 || vs  || Unknown • Riverside, California || 8–12 || 17–3–1 || 0–0
|-

|- align="center" bgcolor="#ccffcc"
| 22 || April 1 || vs  || Unknown • Riverside, California || 6–4 || 18–3–1 || 0–0
|- align="center" bgcolor="#ccffcc"
| 23 || April 1 || vs  || Unknown • Riverside, California || 6–0 || 19–3–1 || 0–0
|- align="center" bgcolor="#ccffcc"
| 24 || April 2 || at  || Unknown • Riverside, California || 10–7 || 20–3–1 || 0–0
|- align="center" bgcolor="#ccffcc"
| 25 || April 4 || vs Ole Miss || Unknown • Riverside, California || 5–1 || 21–3–1 || 0–0
|- align="center" bgcolor="#ffcccc"
| 26 || April 5 || vs  || Unknown • Riverside, California || 3–11 || 21–4–1 || 0–0
|- align="center" bgcolor="#ffcccc"
| 27 || April 5 || vs  || Unknown • Riverside, California || 7–11 || 21–5–1 || 0–0
|- align="center" bgcolor="#ffcccc"
| 28 || April 8 || San Fernando Valley State || Sawtelle Field • Los Angeles, California || 3–4 || 21–6–1 || 0–0
|- align="center" bgcolor="#ccffcc"
| 29 || April 9 || San Diego State || Sawtelle Field • Los Angeles, California || 9–8 || 22–6–1 || 0–0
|- align="center" bgcolor="#ffcccc"
| 30 || April 11 ||  || Sawtelle Field • Los Angeles, California || 2–3 || 22–7–1 || 0–1
|- align="center" bgcolor="#ffcccc"
| 31 || April 12 ||  || Sawtelle Field • Los Angeles, California || 1–3 || 22–8–1 || 0–2
|- align="center" bgcolor="#ccffcc"
| 32 || April 12 || California || Sawtelle Field • Los Angeles, California || 5–3 || 23–8–1 || 1–2
|- align="center" bgcolor="#ccffcc"
| 33 || April 15 ||  || Sawtelle Field • Los* Angeles, California || 11–8 || 24–8–1 || 1–2
|- align="center" bgcolor="#ccffcc"
| 34 || April 18 ||  || Sawtelle Field • Los Angeles, California || 1–0 || 25–8–1 || 2–2
|- align="center" bgcolor="#ccffcc"
| 35 || April 19 ||  || Sawtelle Field • Los Angeles, California || 6–2 || 26–8–1 || 3–2
|- align="center" bgcolor="#ccffcc"
| 36 || April 19 || Washington || Sawtelle Field • Los Angeles, California || 7–0 || 27–8–1 || 4–2
|- align="center" bgcolor="#ffcccc"
| 37 || April 21 ||  || Sawtelle Field • Los Angeles, California || 1–2 || 27–9–1 || 4–3
|- align="center" bgcolor="#ccffcc"
| 38 || April 21 || Oregon || Sawtelle Field • Los Angeles, California || 7–0 || 28–9–1 || 5–3
|- align="center" bgcolor="#ccffcc"
| 39 || April 22 ||  || Sawtelle Field • Los Angeles, California || 2–1 || 29–9–1 || 6–3
|- align="center" bgcolor="#ffcccc"
| 40 || April 25 || at California || Edwards Field • Berkeley, California || 2–3 || 29–10–1 || 6–4
|- align="center" bgcolor="#ccffcc"
| 41 || April 26 || at Stanford || Sunken Diamond • Stanford, California || 5–0 || 30–10–1 || 7–4
|- align="center" bgcolor="#ccffcc"
| 42 || April 26 || at Stanford || Sunken Diamond • Stanford, California || 4–3 || 31–10–1 || 8–4
|-

|- align="center" bgcolor="#ccffcc"
| 43 || May 3 ||  || Sawtelle Field • Los Angeles, California || 6–5 || 32–10–1 || 9–4
|- align="center" bgcolor="#ccffcc"
| 44 || May 9 || at Oregon || Howe Field • Eugene, Oregon || 4–1 || 33–10–1 || 10–4
|- align="center" bgcolor="#ccffcc"
| 45 || May 10 || at Oregon State || Coleman Field • Beaverton, Oregon || 5–1 || 34–10–1 || 11–4
|- align="center" bgcolor="#ccffcc"
| 46 || May 10 || at Oregon State || Coleman Field • Beaverton, Oregon || 3–1 || 35–10–1 || 12–4
|- align="center" bgcolor="#ccffcc"
| 47 || May 12 || at Washington State || Bailey Field • Pullman, Washington || 4–1 || 36–10–1 || 13–4
|- align="center" bgcolor="#ffcccc"
| 48 || May 12 || at Washington State || Bailey Field • Pullman, Washington || 9–7 || 37–10–1 || 14–4
|- align="center" bgcolor="#ccffcc"
| 49 || May 13 || at Washington || Old Graves Field • Seattle, Washington || 5–2 || 38–10–1 || 15–4
|- align="center" bgcolor="#ccffcc"
| 50 || May 16 || USC || Sawtelle Field • Los Angeles, California || 9–4 || 39–10–1 || 16–4
|- align="center" bgcolor="#ccffcc"
| 51 || May 17 || at USC || Bovard Field • Los Angeles, California || 14–5 || 40–10–1 || 17–4
|-

|-
! style="" | Postseason
|- valign="top"

|- align="center" bgcolor="#ccffcc"
| 52 || May 23 ||  || Sawtelle Field • Los Angeles, California || 7–5 || 41–10–1 || 17–4
|- align="center" bgcolor="#ccffcc"
| 53 || May 24 || Santa Clara || Sawtelle Field • Los Angeles, California || 2–1 || 42–10–1 || 17–4
|-

|- align="center" bgcolor="#ffcccc"
| 54 || June 13 || vs Tulsa || Omaha Municipal Stadium • Omaha, Nebraska || 5–6 || 42–11–1 || 17–4
|- align="center" bgcolor="#ffcccc"
| 55 || June 14 || vs Arizona State || Omaha Municipal Stadium • Omaha, Nebraska || 1–2 || 42–12–1 || 17–4
|-

Awards and honors 
Chris Chambliss
 All-Pacific-8

Gary Sanserino
 All-Pac-8

Jim York
 All-Pac-8
Steven Edney
 All-Pac-8

References 

UCLA Bruins baseball seasons
UCLA Bruins baseball
College World Series seasons
UCLA
Pac-12 Conference baseball champion seasons